Freadelpha leucospila is a species of beetle in the family Cerambycidae. It was described by Karl Jordan in 1903. It is known from the Republic of the Congo, the Democratic Republic of the Congo, and Equatorial Guinea.

References

Sternotomini
Beetles described in 1903